Musical theatre dance is known for its dance styles used in it. It's a type of dancing that is popular in musical theatre. The dancers are referred to as "triple threats" from their ability to sing, dance and act.

There have been books written describing the musical theatre choreography from Oxford University Press, and Linda Sabo.

References 

Dance
Theatre
Musical theatre